Richard Cuffari (March 2, 1925 – 1978) was an award-winning American artist. He is known for his illustrations for children's books and science fiction books. Specializing in historical and nonfiction topics, Cuffari illustrated over 200 books.

Biography 

Cuffari was born to immigrant parents in Brooklyn, New York. He attended James Madison High School, winning awards there for his artwork.

During World War II, Cuffari served in the U.S. Army. He graduated from the Pratt Institute in 1949.

He embarked on a freelance career as an illustrator in 1966.

Bibliography (selected) 
 The Wind in the Willows (Grosset & Dunlap, 1966), by Kenneth Grahame
 Nothing is Impossible: The Story of Beatrix Potter (Atheneum, 1969), by Dorothy Aldis
 Old Ben (1970), by Jesse Stuart — selected for the 1970 Lewis Carroll Shelf Award
 The Far Side of Evil (1971), by Sylvia Engdahl
 Eight Stories: The Year of the Three‐Legged Deer (Houghton Mifflin, 1972), by Eth Clifford
 This Star Shall Abide (1972), by Sylvia Engdahl
 Beyond the Tomorrow Mountains (1973), by Sylvia Engdahl
 The Capricorn Bracelet (1973), by Rosemary Sutcliff
 A Wind in the Door (Farrar, Straus & Giroux, 1973), by Madeleine L'Engle
 The Perilous Gard (Houghton Mifflin Harcourt, 1974), by Elizabeth Marie Pope
 Planet-Girded Suns: Man's View of Other Solar Systems (1974), by Sylvia Engdahl
 Ring Out! A Book of Bells (1974), by Jane Yolen
 The Mightiest of Mortals: Hercules (Viking Press, 1975), by Doris Gates
 Universe Ahead: Stories of the Future (1975) — anthology of stories selected and introduced by Sylvia Engdahl and Rick Roberson
 Dragons in the Waters (Farrar, Straus and Giroux, 1976), by Madeleine L'Engle
 The Cartoonist (Viking Books for Young Readers, 1978), by Betsy Byars
 Family Secrets: Five Very Important Stories (1979), by Susan Shreve

References

External links 
 Cuffari books in the Internet Speculative Fiction Database

1925 births
1978 deaths
American children's book illustrators
Pratt Institute alumni
Artists from Brooklyn